Emily Barker (born 2 December 1980) is an Australian singer-songwriter, musician and composer. Her music has featured as the theme to BBC dramas Wallander and The Shadow Line. With multi-instrumental trio the Red Clay Halo, she recorded four albums: Photos.Fires.Fables. (2006), Despite the Snow (2008), Almanac (2011), Dear River (2013), before commencing a solo career with The Toerag Sessions (2015), Sweet Kind of Blue (2017), A Dark Murmuration of Words (2020), and Flight Path Rhymes (2021). Other projects include Vena Portae (with Dom Coyote and Ruben Engzell), Applewood Road (with Amy Speace and Amber Rubarth), and Room 822 (2022) with Lukas Drinkwater.

Career

2002–2007
Emily travelled to the UK in 2002, and was first based in Cambridge where she collaborated with guitarist Rob Jackson. They formed a band called the-low-country which released two albums, Welcome to the-low-country (2003) and The Dark Road (2004), tracks from which enjoyed plays on John Peel's BBC radio show. In October 2005 Emily won Country Song of the Year and Regional Song of the Year awards at the annual West Australian Music Songwriting Awards. Also in 2005, Emily started work on her debut solo album, Photos.Fires.Fables., released on Emily's own label Everyone Sang. The release of this album saw the birth of The Red Clay Halo, an all-female trio of Anna Jenkins (violin, viola), Jo Silverston (cello, bass, banjo, saw), and Gill Sandell (accordion, piano, flute, guitar).

2007–2010
The band's first album released under the name Emily Barker & The Red Clay Halo, Despite The Snow, was recorded in live sessions in a 16th-century barn in Norfolk. Released in November 2008 on Everyone Sang, the album again garnered much praise. In late 2008, the album's opening track "Nostalgia" was discovered by composer Martin Phipps who re-recorded it with Emily for use as the theme tune for the hit television series Wallander on BBC1 starring Northern Irish actor Kenneth Branagh. The first series, which attracted over 6 million viewers per episode, won a slew of awards, including several BAFTAs and a Royal Television Society award for its theme tune.

2011

In February 2011, Almanac was released, once again on Everyone Sang. The release of this album was accompanied by sessions for Cerys Matthews on 6 Music and Radio 4's Loose Ends, while the single "Little Deaths" was record of the week on Nemone's show on 6 Music. Emily and the band again went on the road in the UK, culminating in a complete performance of Almanac at St Giles-in-the-Fields church in London. Almanac was jointly funded by spareroom.com, and a fan-funded campaign on Pledgemusic.com.

The song "Pause" from Almanac was the theme tune for a major 2011 BBC2 drama serial, The Shadow Line, starring Chiwetel Ejiofor and Christopher Eccleston. Martin Phipps again adapted the song for the title sequence.

2012
Early in 2012, Emily began a working relationship with producer Calum Malcolm, having been introduced to him by Gilad Tiefenbrun of Linn Products. Emily and The Red Clay Halo went into Gorbals Sound studios in Glasgow and recorded four songs, including a new version of Emily's murder ballad duet, "Fields of June", which had first appeared on Photos.Fires.Fables.; on this version, the male vocal part was sung by Frank Turner and was released as a limited 7" white vinyl on Xtra Mile Recordings. The band then went back in to Gorbals Sound with Calum Malcolm in June 2012 to record their next album, Dear River. Shortly after completing the recordings, Emily, Anna, Gill and Jo were invited by Frank Turner to perform with him at the Olympics Opening Ceremony.
In the autumn of 2012, Emily toured Europe alongside Chuck Ragan, Cory Branan, Rocky Votolato, and Jay Malinowski as part of The Revival Tour., and the day after the last date on that tour, on 21 November 2012, Emily Barker & The Red Clay Halo played a sold out headline show at London's Union Chapel.

2013
Dear River was released on 8 July 2013, charting at 99 in the official UK album charts, 23 in the Independent Albums chart, and 7 in the Record Store Albums chart, spending 4 weeks in the top 20. Reviews were very favourable in both mainstream and specialist press: Will Hodgkinson in The Times gave the album a four star lead review, saying it contained "heartfelt songwriting... bridging the gap between folk, country and Fleetwood Mac".

2014
Emily Barker & The Red Clay Halo released a special limited edition 10" vinyl EP for Record Store Day on 19 April 2014. They celebrated the release by doing a tour of independent record stores, performing at seven stores over the holiday weekend
Working once again with Martin Phipps, Emily composed music for The Keeping Room starring Sam Worthington and Brit Marling. She then went on to compose her first feature-length soundtrack for the UK movie Hector (2015) starring Peter Mullan, released in December 2015.

2020 
Emily Barker released A Dark Murmuration of Words in 2020. This album was inspired by a concern with the impact of climate change on the natural world. Emily Barker explained: "Last year the climate crisis was very much at the forefront of all of our conversations and thoughts, wondering what we can do to adapt, and feeling helpless and guilty and angry and upset and all these things" Emily Barker commented: ""Environment and equality are very important to me, and it’s finding the right perspective to write that from and being respectful of the people in society who are suffering".

In an interview with Bernard Zuel, Emily Barker elaborated upon her intentions, with the album:

“It was really a response to a lot of what was going on in 2019 with the collective awakening of the environmental crisis. And it was terrifying. It’s something that I’d been aware of before, and I was brought up by parents who were very conscious of that anyway, but I think a lot of people really looked at the personal impact in a big way and started realising the scale of this emergency. It’s so hard to compute but for me, writing songs helps me to make sense of things that I can’t process".

Emily Barker commented that the album involves a "lots of processing the emotional response to the environmental crisis".

Emily Barker also covered a Billy Bragg song, 'Can't Be There Today', in 2020 as part of a campaign to save musical venues during the COVID-19 crisis.

2021 
Emily Barker released an alternative version of A Dark Murmuration of Words in 2021 – called Flight Path Rhymes. She discussed the reworking of the album:

Recording A Dark Murmuration of Words was a wonderful immersive experience that involved my live band and multiple conversations with producer Greg Freeman. It was only as the album was coming together that I realised how all the songs intertwined...how, despite their different subjects, there was an underlying theme that tied them all together.

That realisation found an outlet not only in the album itself, but also in a poem I wrote soon after the recording sessions were over. I've always been a fan of poetry, but until a couple of years ago, I'd never written any myself. I took the plunge by signing up to an online course, and began to share my new work with some Stroud-based poet friends. I found it an exciting new outlet for conveying thoughts and ideas that wouldn't necessarily fit within the confines of a song."

2022 
Emily Barker and Lukas Drinkwater released an album of covers called Room 822 in 2022, which were recorded during quarantine isolation during the COVID-19 crisis. Emily Barker explained her choices of covers:

I found myself gravitating towards songs that meant a lot to me in my late teens growing up in WA – songs I would put on the tape deck of my yellow VW Beetle while driving to the coast with the windows down, singing at the top of my lungs. From that period we chose 'Black the Sun' by Alex Lloyd, 'Mr. Milk' by You Am I, 'Tomorrow' by Silverchair and 'The Captain' by Kasey Chambers. I also listened to anything and everything by The Waifs, and for obvious reasons, we chose 'London Still'. The Church's 'Under the Milky Way' and Deborah Conway's 'Will You Miss Me When You're Sober' were staples as I was growing up. It was great to share these songs and artists with Lukas, and get his thoughts on them – turns out that he was also a big Silverchair fan as a teenager.

To complete the album we chose some more contemporary songs which we both knew. 'Boys Will be Boys' by Stella Donnelly we discovered when visiting a record shop in Fremantle a couple of years ago when we asked the retailer if he could recommend anything new. He was glowing about Stella’s EP 'Thrush Metal' which we bought on the spot. We then had the pleasure of sharing a stage with Stella at Billy Bragg’s 'Songwriters in the Round' at Glastonbury Festival in 2019. We couldn't not choose a Nick Cave song – after much discussion we landed on 'Push the Sky Away' – nor could we miss Paul Kelly, but rather than delving into his illustrious past, we chose one of his most recent songs, 'Sleep, Australia, Sleep', which shows he has lost none of his urgency and relevance as a songwriter.

Fanny Lumsden appears on the version of 'Under the Milky Way', and Jack Carty appears on 'Black the Sun'.

Discography

Emily Barker
Photos.Fires.Fables. (2006)
The Toerag Sessions (2015)
Sweet Kind of Blue (2017)
A Dark Murmuration of Words (2020)
Flight Path Rhymes (2021)

Emily Barker & Lukas Drinkwater 

 Room 822 (2022)

Marry Waterson & Emily Barker
A Window to Other Ways (2019)

Applewood Road
Applewood Road (2016)

Emily Barker & The Red Clay Halo
Despite The Snow (2008)
Almanac (2011)
Dear River (2013)
Songs Beneath the River EP (2014)

Vena Portae
Vena Portae (2014)

References

External links

1980 births
Living people
Australian folk singers
Australian folk musicians
English folk musicians
English folk singers
21st-century Australian women singers
21st-century Australian singers
English women singer-songwriters
People from Bridgetown, Western Australia
21st-century English women singers
21st-century English singers
Australian women singer-songwriters